Zahl may refer to:

Zahl (surname)
Zahl, North Dakota, unincorporated community in northwestern Williams County, North Dakota, United States
 Lake Zahl National Wildlife Refuge, Williams County in the U.S. state of North Dakota

Fiction 
 General Zahl, a DC Comics villain